

On 20 February 2017, rioting broke out in Rinkeby, a predominantly Muslim immigrant-populated suburb of the Swedish capital Stockholm.

Rinkeby was previously the site of riots in 2010 and 2013.

Events
Rioting broke out in the evenings between Monday, 20 February - Thursday, 23 February, with a crowd of 25 to 30 masked men who assembled after a drug-related arrest near the Metro station. In four hours of unrest, several fires were started, at least seven cars burnt, shops vandalized and police hit with rocks. One rioter was arrested for rock throwing. The fire department had to wait for the police to secure the area before being able to extinguish the burning cars. A number of shops were looted and a business owner was assaulted after having tried to stop the attackers. According to Lars Bystrom, a police spokesman, a police officer "shot for effect" with intent to hit his target, but missed, and to clear the scene so the police could make an arrest. A photographer from Dagens Nyheter newspaper said he was assaulted by a group of around 15 people.

The Swedish police were criticized by local residents for taking too long to subdue the rioters and not doing enough to stop them.

President Trump's remark
Because the riots broke out two days after the president of the United States of America, Donald Trump, mentioned a Fox News segment he had seen about Sweden the night before, the Rinkeby riots of 2017 drew wide international attention. The president was mocked for the remarks by the international press, as well as Swedish officials.

See also 

 2008 Malmö mosque riots
 2009 Malmö anti-Israel riots
 2016 social unrest in Sweden
 Arson attacks on asylum centres in Sweden
 We Are Sthlm sexual assaults
 2003 & 2005 Malmö mosque arson attack
 2010 & 2012 Malmö synagogue arson attack

References

External links 
Sweden probes riot in mainly immigrant Stockholm suburb. BBC

2010s in Stockholm
2017 crimes in Sweden
2017 fires in Europe
2017 riots
Arson in Sweden
Protests in Sweden
Protests in the European Union
February 2017 crimes in Europe
Metropolitan Stockholm
Race riots in Sweden
Riots and civil disorder in Sweden